Adventure is the second studio album by American rock band Television, released in April 1978 by Elektra Records.

Musical style 

On the album's sound, Mark Deming of AllMusic writes, "Where Marquee Moon was direct and straightforward in its approach, with the subtleties clearly in the performance and not in the production, Adventure is a decidedly softer and less aggressive disc, and while John Jansen's production isn't intrusive, it does round off the edges of the band's sound in a way Andy Johns' work on the first album did not."

Reception 

Ken Emerson of Rolling Stone wrote, "By daring to be different, Adventure lives up to its title, but it also comes as something of a disappointment because it lacks the jagged tension and mysterious drama that imbued last year's Marquee Moon with such dark but lucid power." Robert Christgau of The Village Voice was favorable, writing, "I agree that it's not as urgent, or as satisfying, but that's only to say that Marquee Moon was a great album while Adventure is a very good one. The difference is more a function of material than of the new album's relatively clean, calm, reflective mood. The lyrics on Marquee Moon were shot through with visionary surprises that never let up. These are comparatively songlike, their apercus concentrated in hook lines that are surrounded by more quotidian stuff."

Track listing

Personnel 

Television
 Billy Ficca – drums
 Richard Lloyd – guitar, vocals
 Fred Smith – bass, vocals
 Tom Verlaine – lead vocals, guitar, piano, production

Technical
 Craig Bishop – engineering
 Jay Borden – engineering
 John Jansen – production, engineering
 Paul Jansen – art direction
 Gray Russell – engineering
 Gerrit van der Meer – photography

References

External links 

 

1978 albums
Television (band) albums
Elektra Records albums